Endangered Girls is a 1958 German crime film directed by Wolfgang Glück and starring Gerlinde Locker, Wolf Albach-Retty and Heinz Drache. The film was released in the UK in 1959 as Dolls of Vice and in Italy in 1958 under the title Diecimila Donne Alla Deriva.

Location shooting took place in Hamburg and Vienna.

Cast
 Wolf Albach-Retty as Dr. Thomas Jensen
 Gerlinde Locker as Erika
 Sigrid Marquardt as Christa Ritter
 Heinz Drache as Heinz Sanders
 Edith Elmay as Sonja
 Emmerich Schrenk as Mario Cortez
 Marina Petrova as Draga
 Horst Beck as Meidecke
 Raoul Retzer as Schiffskapitän
 Robert Meyn as Maulbeck, Kriminalkommissar
 Fatty George as Himself, and his Jazz.-Band
 Else Rambausek as Hausmeisterin in Wien
 Gert Türmer as Kraus, Conferencier

Censorship
When Gefährdete Mädchen was first released in Italy in 1958 the Committee for the Theatrical Review of the Italian Ministry of Cultural Heritage and Activities rated the film suitable for people 16 years and older as long as the following frames are removed: the two dancers Alma and Annelore topless and Draga, topless, taking photographs of Sanders. The reason for the age restriction, cited in the official documents, is because of the corrupted and immoral environment in which the sequence takes place. The official document number is: 30750, it was signed on 10 December 1959 by Minister Domenico Magrì.

References

 Database of the documents produced by the Committee for the Theatrical Review of The Italian Ministry of Cultural Heritage and Activities, from 1944 to 2000.

Bibliography
 Thomas Elsaesser & Michael Wedel. The BFI companion to German cinema. British Film Institute, 1999.

External links
 

1958 films
1958 crime films
German crime films
West German films
Films set in Hamburg
1950s German-language films
1950s German films